Benton Township is an inactive township in Howell County, in the U.S. state of Missouri.

Benton Township has the name of the local Benton family.

References

Townships in Missouri
Townships in Howell County, Missouri